Euphrasia crassiuscula   is a perennial herb in  the genus Euphrasia. It is endemic to the Victorian Alps  in Australia.
The species was formally described by French botanist Michel Gandoger  based on plant material collected by Carl Walter. Three subspecies are currently recognised:

E. crassiuscula Gand. subsp. crassiuscula
E. crassiuscula  subsp. eglandulosa (J.H.Willis) W.R.Barker 
E. crassiuscula  subsp. glandulifera W.R.Barker - thick eyebright, listed as "vulnerable" under the Commonwealth
Environment Protection and Biodiversity Conservation Act 1999.

References

crassiuscula
Lamiales of Australia
Flora of Victoria (Australia)